Chloraea is a genus of flowering plants from the orchid family, Orchidaceae. It contains 52 currently recognized species, native to South America and to the Falkland Islands.

Species 

 Chloraea alpina 
 Chloraea apinnula 
 Chloraea barbata 
 Chloraea bella 
 Chloraea bidentata 
 Chloraea biserialis 
 Chloraea bletioides 
 Chloraea boliviana 
 Chloraea calantha 
 Chloraea castillonii 
 Chloraea chica 
 Chloraea chrysantha 
 Chloraea cogniauxii 
 Chloraea crispa 
 Chloraea cristata 
 Chloraea cuneata 
 Chloraea curicana 
 Chloraea cylindrostachya 
 Chloraea deflexa 
 Chloraea densipapillosa 
 Chloraea disoides 
 Chloraea elegans 
 Chloraea fiebrigiana 
 Chloraea fonkii 
 Chloraea galeata 
 Chloraea gavilu 
 Chloraea grandiflora 
 Chloraea heteroglossa 
 Chloraea lamellata 
 Chloraea laxiflora 
 Chloraea lechleri 
 Chloraea longipetala 
 Chloraea magellanica 
 Chloraea major 
 Chloraea membranacea 
 Chloraea multiflora 
 Chloraea multilineolata 
 Chloraea nudilabia 
 Chloraea philippii 
 Chloraea phoenicea 
 Chloraea piquichen 
 Chloraea praecincta 
 Chloraea prodigiosa 
 Chloraea reticulata 
 Chloraea septentrionalis 
 Chloraea speciosa 
 Chloraea subpandurata 
 Chloraea tectata 
 Chloraea undulata 
 Chloraea venosa 
 Chloraea viridiflora 
 Chloraea volkmannii

See also
 List of Orchidaceae genera

References

 Pridgeon, A.M., Cribb, P.J., Chase, M.A. & Rasmussen, F. eds. (2003). Genera Orchidacearum 3. Oxford Univ. Press
 Berg Pana, H. 2005. Handbuch der Orchideen-Namen. Dictionary of Orchid Names. Dizionario dei nomi delle orchidee. Ulmer, Stuttgart

External links

Cranichideae genera
Chloraeinae